Charles Hinman Graves (August 14, 1839 – October 7, 1928) was an American army officer, politician, and diplomat.

Military
Hinman was born in Springfield, Massachusetts on August 14, 1839. After the outbreak of the Civil War, he joined the Army of the Potomac as a sergeant.  Breveted four times for gallantry in action, he participated in many battles in the Eastern Theater, and finished the war at the rank of lieutenant colonel.  The war over, Graves decided to stay in the army until December 1870, at which time he was discharged from the Thirty-fourth infantry.

Politics
Following his discharge from the army, Graves moved to the port city of Duluth, Minnesota, where he initially involved himself various business ventures including shipping, real estate, iron mining, and insurance, and became the first person to ship wheat from Duluth's port in 1871. He then entered local politics, first as a Republican in the Minnesota Senate representing District 29 from 1873 to 1876. He then served as Mayor of Duluth from 1881 to 1883. On November 11, 1888 he was elected to the Minnesota House of Representatives from District 46, serving a term from January 9, 1889 to January 5, 1891, during which time he served as Speaker of the House for the twenty-sixth Minnesota Legislature.

Later life
Graves was later appointed  as United States Ambassador to Sweden from 1905 to 1913 and to Norway from 1905 to 1906.  Just before leaving for his posts, Graves announced at a farewell banquet that he would be marrying a Miss Alice Kinney from Athens, Pennsylvania on April 25. The two married; his wife died in 1949.

Graves died in Santa Barbara, California on October 7, 1928.

Notes

References

1839 births
1928 deaths
Politicians from Springfield, Massachusetts
People of Massachusetts in the American Civil War
Ambassadors of the United States to Norway
Ambassadors of the United States to Sweden
Minnesota state senators
Members of the Minnesota House of Representatives
Speakers of the Minnesota House of Representatives
Mayors of Duluth, Minnesota